Sal Rosselli (born 1949, New York City) is president of the National Union of Healthcare Workers. He was the president of SEIU United Healthcare Workers West until 2009, when the local union was placed into trusteeship by its parent union, SEIU.

NUHW was formed by Rosselli and former members of UHW-West following the trusteeship. UHW-West's leadership had refused to support the transfer of 65,000 homecare and nursing home workers into a different SEIU local union. The local had also been critical of deals struck by SEIU that prohibited nursing home employees from reporting safety concerns to authorities. After a brief standoff, SEIU International President Andy Stern placed UHW-West in trusteeship, removing its leaders and appointing two senior SEIU staff members to run the local. The ousted leaders, together with other disgruntled members, announced the formation of NUHW just days later.> SEIU filed a federal lawsuit against NUHW and several former SEIU-UHW staff members in 2009, alleging they breached their fiduciary duty for opposing SEIU's efforts to impose a trusteeship and for working to build a rival union while still employed by SEIU. On April 9, 2010, a jury awarded a total of $737,850 in damages to SEIU.

In 1969, Rosselli worked with Dorothy Day of the Catholic Worker group, and later spent two years in the Peace Corps. He also worked with the Alice B. Toklas LGBT Democratic Club in the 1980s, becoming president of the club in 1984. He is a board member of Rainbow/PUSH. He has served as grand marshal of the San Francisco Pride parade and is one of the most prominent openly gay labor leaders.

References

External links
 Rosselli's bio formerly at official SEIU United Healthcare Workers website
Rosselli interview at Labor Notes

Matt Smith, "Stern Reprimand", SF Weekly (June 12, 2007)

Kris Maher, "Union Resists SEIU Effort to Centralize Control", The Wall Street Journal (January 22, 2009)
George Raine, "Ousted SEIU Leaders Push Decertification Vote", San Francisco Chronicle (February 3, 2009)
Steven T. Jones, "Fallout From Union Clash", San Francisco Bay Guardian (February 4, 2009)

1949 births
American trade union leaders
Service Employees International Union people
Living people
Trade unionists from New York (state)
American LGBT rights activists
Activists from New York City